The South Korea men's national water polo team represents South Korea in international men's water polo competitions.

Results

Olympic Games
1988 — 12th place

World Championships
2019 — 금메달

Asian Games
1986 –  Silver Medal
1990 –  Bronze Medal
1994 – 5th place
2002 – 5th place
2006 – 7th place
2010 – 4th place
2014 – 4th place
2018 – 5th place

Current roster
Roster for the 2019 World Championships.

Head coach: Go Ki-mura

References

Water polo
Korea, South
Korea, South
Korea, South